Susan Jean Babinec is an American battery scientist who is Program Lead for Stationary Storage at the Argonne National Laboratory. She looks to develop a future electric grid for the United States.

Early life and education 
Babinec completed a degree in chemistry at the University of Wisconsin.

Research and career 
Babinec spent the first twenty years of her career at Dow Chemical Company, where she worked as  a senior electrochemist. She was honored as Inventor of the Year, and the first woman corporate fellow. At Dow, Babinec worked on cathode electrodes for lithium ion batteries. She investigated how the binder and porosity of the electrodes impacted the electrochemical and mechanical properties. She co-invented a low cost display technology that became a venture-funded start-up. She became frustrated by Dow's lack of investment in new technologies, and moved to A123, a company who were pursuing new battery materials. When A123 found a defect in one of their batteries, they were forced to recall products, which resulted in the company going bankrupt.

Babinec joined the United States Department of Energy ARPA-E program that looked to support energy projects. During her six years at ARPA-E, Babinec invested $120 million into battery companies, including Natron Energy, Sila Nanotechnologies and Ion Storage Systems.

In 2019, Babinec was appointed to Argonne National Laboratory's grid energy storage program. She looks to optimize energy storage capabilities by integrating grid design with industry needs. To better understand battery materials, she developed rapid life cycle evaluations and pioneered the use of artificial intelligence. She launched the Battery Data Genome project, a challenge to collect, store and share usable information from every stage of the battery lifecycle. The Battery Data Genome Project looks to transform understanding about electric vehicles.

Selected publications

Personal life 
Babinec is an athlete, and has played competitively since her time at college.

References 

Year of birth missing (living people)
Living people
American women chemists
20th-century American chemists
20th-century American women scientists
21st-century American chemists
21st-century American women scientists
University of Wisconsin alumni
Dow Chemical Company employees
Argonne National Laboratory people